General elections were held in Saint Vincent and the Grenadines in 1951. The result was a victory for the Eighth Army of Liberation, which won all eight seats. Voter turnout was 69.7%.

Results

References

Saint Vincent
Elections in Saint Vincent and the Grenadines
1951 in Saint Vincent and the Grenadines
British Windward Islands